FC Zhashtyk-Ak-Altyn Kara-Suu is a Kyrgyz football club based in Kara-Suu, Kyrgyzstan. They are the only club in football history to appear in six straight cup finals and lose all of them. They are also one of two clubs in the world to lose all 7 national cup finals that they attended without winning a cup ever.
Their name means white-gold youth of Kara-Suu, Kara-Suu meaning black water.

History 
1993: Founded as FC Aka-Atyn Kara-Suu.
1994: Renamed FC Ak-Altyn Kara-Suu.
1998: Renamed to FC Zhashtyk-Ak-Altyn Kara-Suu after merger with FC Zhashtyk Osh.

Current squad

Achievements
Kyrgyzstan League
Champions (1): 2003
Kyrgyzstan Cup
Runners-up (7): 2001, 2002, 2003, 2004, 2005, 2006, 2008
FC Zhastyk hold the world record for the most consecutive losing appearances in a national football cup final. The first five of these losses were all by 0–1 (the sixth by 0–4); the first three against SKA-PVO Bishkek and the last three against Dordoi-Dinamo Naryn. Prior to their 'feat', this record was shared by USM Alger, who appeared in five consecutive Algerian cup finals from 1969 to 1973 and lost all of them, and Al-Ramtha, who did the same in Jordan from 1993 to 1997.

Performance in AFC competitions
AFC Champions League: 1 appearance
2002–03: Qualifying West – 2nd Round

References

External links 
Career stats by KLISF

Football clubs in Kyrgyzstan
1993 establishments in Kyrgyzstan